Francissca Peter & Friends – The Love & Hope Album is a full studio album from Malaysian award-winning singer and songwriter, Francissca Peter released in 2012.  Fran is also the World Vision Malaysia Ambassador for 8th year running.

The Francissca Peter & Friends – The Love & Hope Album reminds us of the greatness of love and the power of hope. It shows the wonderful things we can achieve when we come together as one to give each other a hand regardless of religion, race, ethnicity or gender.  For truly, when we love, we find that love motivates, love heals and love brings hope.

All proceeds from the sale of this album will be channelled to the World Vision Children Development Fund.

Fran on what is charity?

"People talk a lot about charity but what is truly charity?

To me this is what charity is about :
It is about Giving and not counting what you gave.
It is about Caring and not holding back.
It is about Loving and not hating.
It is about Compassion and not turning a blind eye.
It is about Kindness and not having to ask.
It is about Truth and no lies.
It is about Hope for those who hurt.
It is a Touch when one is suffering.
It is about Change and making a difference."

Awards and recognitions
 Francissca Peter & Friends: The Love & Hope Album is produced in collaboration with Petaling Jaya-based Christian humanitarian organisation World Vision Malaysia Bhd (WVM) and launched in conjunction with World Vision's Gift of Hope (GOH) Catalogue, an alternative gift catalogue put together by WVM to help those in need.
 The 12-track album include songs in Tamil, Mandarin and Temuan (local indigenous language) and features seven solos by Peter and duets with local singers Juwita Suwito, Daniel Lee, Daniel Louis, indigenous singers Ramlan Koyok, Haing Alin and Rudy Malam, and narratives by TV host William Lee and model/beauty queen Deborah Henry.
 2013 will mark in Francissca's 8th year running of my Ambassadorship to World Vision Malaysia.
 Label and Executive Producer: World Vision Malaysia
 Producers: Francissca Peter, Steve Leong and Bibiana Peter

Track listing

References

External links
 Official Website
 Official Facebook
 Official Myspace
 Official Twitter
 Official Youtube

2012 albums
Francissca Peter albums